The Welsh Baseball Union (WBU) (founded 1892) is the national governing body of the traditional code of Welsh baseball in Wales.

It is a member of the International Baseball Board. The WBU organises the men's and youth league and cup competitions, as well as selecting and managing the Wales international teams at adult and youth level.

The Welsh Baseball Union is based in Cardiff.

See also
Welsh Ladies Baseball Union

References

External links
Welsh Baseball
 Baseball Bill Barrett explains Welsh Baseball .

Baseball
British baseball in the United Kingdom
Governing bodies of British baseball
Organisations based in Cardiff
1892 establishments in Wales
Sports organizations established in 1892